Liliana Berezowsky (born April 22, 1944) is a Canadian artist known for her public sculptures.

Early life and education
She was born in Krakow and emigrated to Canada in 1948. She attended elementary and high schools in Toronto; post secondary education at the following:
University of Toronto, where she received her B.A., majoring in Sociology; and the John Abbott College, Md., where she received a diploma in Ceramics Technology. She studied fine art at Concordia University, receiving a BFA degree in 1984 and a Master of Fine Arts degree in 1989.

She has had many solo and group exhibitions of her work. She has taught sculpture at: Concordia University, Montreal (1988-1992); McGill University (1988); and the Saidye Bronfman Centre (1989-1990). Her awards include: Concordia University Graduate Fellowship (1986) (1987) (1988); Fonds F.C.A.R. Que. (1986) (1987) (1988); Concordia Teaching Fellowship (1988-89); and many Canada Council Grants. She lives at Senneville, Quebec.

Collections
Her work is included in the collections of the Musée national des beaux-arts du Québec, the City of Montreal public art collection and the National Gallery of Canada

References

1944 births
20th-century Canadian women artists
21st-century Canadian women artists
Living people